The 2019 Guangzhou Evergrande Taobao season is the 66th year in Guangzhou Evergrande's existence and its 52nd season in the Chinese football league, also its 30th season in the top flight.

Transfers

In

Winter

Summer

Out

Winter

Summer

Pre-season and friendlies

Training matches

Competitions

Chinese Super League

Table

Results by round

Results summary

Matches

Chinese FA Cup

AFC Champions League

Group stage

Knockout stage

Round of 16 

4–4 on aggregate. Guangzhou Evergrande won on penalty shoot-out.

Quarter-finals 

1–1 on aggregate. Guangzhou Evergrande won on away goals.

Semi-finals 

Guangzhou Evergrande lost 0–3 on aggregate.

Statistics

Appearances and goals

Goalscorers

Disciplinary record

References

Guangzhou F.C.
Guangzhou F.C. seasons